Lee Hyung-Suk (born September 9, 2000) is a South Korean actor. He began his career as a child actor.

Filmography

Television series

Films

Musical theatre

Awards and nominations

References

External links
 
 
 
 

2000 births
Living people
South Korean male child actors
South Korean male television actors
South Korean male film actors
South Korean male musical theatre actors
South Korean male stage actors
People from Cheongju